The Varodd Bridges are two parallel cantilever bridges in Kristiansand municipality, in Agder county, Norway, and they cross the Topdalsfjorden. They are named after the peninsula on the western shore. It goes from Vige and ends in Søm in Kristiansand. The bridges carry the European route E18 highway over the fjord.

Old Bridge
The Old Varodd Bridge was a former suspension bridge, which opened in 1956. Before the completion of the second bridge, this was the only bridge crossing Topdalsfjorden, making it a two-lane bridge carrying traffic in both directions. The replacement bridge was built in between the two current bridges and construction began in early 2017. The suspension bridge was demolished and removed in the fall of 2020.

New bridges

The New Varodd Bridge is parallel to the older bridge, and was completed in 1993 at a cost of US$13 million. It is a cantilever bridge with four spans. The bridge has a  clearance below it. The bridge was built solely to relieve the traffic on the older bridge, and the two lanes only handled westbound traffic.

Another new cantilever bridge for eastbound traffic is under construction between the old and new Varodd Bridge. It was completed in 2020.

Gallery

References

Geography of Kristiansand
Bridges in Agder
Suspension bridges in Norway
Bridges completed in 1956
Bridges completed in 1993